KCSU-FM (90.5 FM) is Colorado State University's non-commercial, student-run, campus radio station licensed to Fort Collins, Colorado. KCSU broadcasts at 10,000 watts, reaching east to Greeley, south to Longmont, and north to the Wyoming border. KCSU a 501c3 non-profit organization affiliated with Rocky Mountain Student Media Corporation and is one of the largest college radio stations in the country.  The KCSU broadcast signal reaches over 250,000 people.

Format
KCSU is music intensive, focusing on college and alternative musical genres. KCSU also provides newscasts, sports updates, a public affairs talk show, and Public Service Announcements (PSAs). However, there are three different show formats that make up the majority of KCSU programming.

Rotation Hours: 
KCSU rotation music programmed from 7:00 am to 5:00 pm is played from prime-time rotation. Rotation is a large compilation of newly released local, national, and international music. Rotation DJs represent the voice of KCSU and provide the community with the newest music, sports, and news.

Specialty: 
Between the hours of 5:00pm and 6:00am KCSU plays specialty shows. A specialty show at KCSU is a two-hour show focusing on one particular genre of music or topic.  There is no limit on the type of music or programming that can be featured on a specialty show, as long as the show follows KCSU and FCC guidelines.

Experimental: 
From 1:00am to 6:00am KCSU airs experimental music. The DJs during this time play whatever they want, provided the music is in compliance with KCSU and FCC regulations.

History
“This is KCSU FM, 90.9 megacycles, in Fort Collins, Colorado, the voice of Colorado State University.”

September 21, 1964- The above introduction was the first statement ever made over the air by KCSU. KCSU began as a student operated station and broadcast at 800 watts from a transmitter located at the corner of Prospect Road and Shields Street.  KCSU broadcast Monday through Friday from 4 p.m. to midnight.  Programs first heard on KCSU included jazz and classical music, news, interviews and public affairs.

September 1977- KCSU changed from student management to a professional station, and the station began airing 18 hours a day, 365 days a year.  The change to professional management occurred after financial problems surfaced and students complained that student managers and staff were no longer representing the music and programming interests of students.

March 1, 1981- Professional management adopted a classical format with a strong commitment to news and information.   This new format set the stage for problems with the student population, which continued to fund the station with student fees without a voice in programming choices.

September 1983- KCSU boosted its signal from 2,400 watts to 10,000 watts and changed from 90.9 on the FM radio dial to the present-day frequency of 90.5.

July 1995- In response to student complaints about programming and budgetary problems due to insufficient financial support in the Fort Collins community, KCSU shifted from classical programming to an adult album alternative format in 1992.  The change was not enough, and the Campus Radio Committee was formed in the fall of 1994. The Campus Radio Committee recommended that KCSU change from an entirely professionally run, public radio station to a campus radio station with a blend of student program management and professional operations management and advisers as of July 1, 1995.

July 27, 1997- A massive flood hit Fort Collins and Colorado State University was extensively damaged. The destruction of the radio station’s studios, equipment and offices, along with all of the Student Media (Campus TV, The Rocky Mountain Collegian newspaper, and the Silver Spruce Yearbook at the time) forced the station to relocate to the annex at the old Fort Collins High School.

August 20, 1997- Three weeks after the flood, KCSU resumes broadcasting using donated and salvaged equipment. KCSU began broadcasting from an old garage, affectionately called the “bus barn”, and staff dealt with, security issues, DJ and listener dissent, and a hurt public image caused by lower broadcast quality as a result of the flood-damaged equipment.  Despite these setbacks, KCSU won several radio awards and the title of the Fort Collins Coloradoan’s Best of Fort Collins.

Jan. 5, 1999- KCSU moved back to campus and became operational at its current location. 
KCSU resumed broadcast operations in a new, state-of-the-art radio studio, one of the best equipped in Colorado. Broadcast quality dramatically improved thanks to new digital signal processors, better production equipment, and a new broadcast board.  New production facilities and a performance studio were added to KCSU, as well as new office space.

August 1st, 2008- KCSU and the rest of Student Media (Collegian, CTV, College Avenue) became a 501c3, not-for-profit organization independent from the University called The Rocky Mountain Student Media Corp.

May 4th, 2013- KCSU and the rest of Student Media began their move to their temporary home while the Colorado State University Student Center undergoes renovations.

May 10th, 2013- At 12:36 PM MST, KCSU began broadcasting from its new location, 706 S College Ave. Suite 207.

September 22, 2014- KCSU Returned their broadcast operations to the Lory Student Center after renovations to the building were completed.

July 2017- KCSU established our new mission statement: "The mission of KCSU is to train students to collaboratively operate a radio station that creates and delivers content that informs and inspires our listeners."

External links
Official Website
KCSU App

CSU-FM
CSU-FM
Radio stations established in 1964
1964 establishments in Colorado